"Read All About It, Pt. III" is a song by Scottish recording artist Emeli Sandé, from her debut album, Our Version of Events (2012). The song was written by Sandé, Professor Green, Iain James, Tom Barnes, Ben Kohn and Pete Kelleher and produced by Gavin Powell. It is a sequel to the 2011 hit single "Read All About It", which appears on Professor Green's second studio album, At Your Inconvenience (2011). The song was first performed at the 2012 Summer Olympics closing ceremony. It has received positive reviews from critics.

Background 
In 2010, Sandé began working with Professor Green on her debut album. The pair had previously worked together on the rapper's debut album Alive Till I'm Dead (2010), featuring on the track "Kids That Love to Dance". Sandé got on with Professor Green and the pair returned a year later and worked on his second studio album, At Your Inconvenience (2011), with Sandé featuring on "Read All About It". Professor Green released the song as the lead single from the album, and it peaked at number-one on the UK Singles Chart.

Following the release and the commercial success of the song, in 2011, Sandé wanted to record her own version of the song. Sandé said that after she and Professor Green had done many shows together to promote the song, she heard and saw how personal the song was for him. She said the song started to make her think "what does the song mean to me, and what's my interpretation of it?". Sandé then decided to write her own version of the song. She said that she wrote the song like it was a story of her life, and that it is different from the original song. Critics often pick out the similarities between "Read All About It" and "Love the Way You Lie" and then "Read All About It, Pt. III" and "Love the Way You Lie (Part II)". Following its performance at the Olympics, "Read All About It, Pt. III" began to get airplay on BBC Radio 2.

Live performances 
Sandé notably performed the track on 12 August 2012 as part of the 2012 Summer Olympics closing ceremony, opening the show itself when she performed acoustically from the back seat of a car. Sandé proceeded to reprise the track later in the ceremony, shortly after Ray Davies' performance of "Waterloo Sunset".

The song was used as the music for the 2013 audition of Attraction on Britain's Got Talent.

The performance saw a significant rise in sales of Sandé's music digitally, with "Read All About It, Pt. III" reaching a peak of number eleven on UK iTunes within twelve hours of the ceremony.

Charts

Weekly charts

Year-end charts

Certifications

References

Songs written by Iain James
Songs written by Emeli Sandé
2012 songs
Songs written by Peter Kelleher (songwriter)
Songs written by Tom Barnes (songwriter)
Songs written by Ben Kohn
Songs written by Professor Green